Parliamentary elections were held in Greece on 20 February 1905. Supporters of Theodoros Deligiannis emerged as the largest bloc in Parliament, with 144 of the 235 seats. 

Deligiannis remained Prime Minister after the election, but he was assassinated on 13 June and was succeeded by Dimitrios Rallis.

Results

References

Greece
Parliamentary elections in Greece
1905 in Greece
Greece
1900s in Greek politics
Legis